Regular session of the working bodies can be convened by the President of the working body 14 days before the session.

Urgent session can be convened by in shorter time based on the:

 resolution of the Assembly,
 resolution of the Council,
 request by the one third of the members of the working body or
 request by the political group.

If President of the working body does not convene the session, it can be convened by the Speaker and presided over by the oldest Vice-President.

List of session of the working bodies of the 8th National Assembly:

Committees

Committee on Agriculture, Forestry and Food (CAFF)

Committee on Culture (CC)

Committee on Defence (CD)

Committee on Education, Science, Sport and Youth (CESSY)

Committee on EU Affairs (CEU)

Committee on Finance (CF)

Committee on Foreign Policy (CFP)

Committee on Health (CH)

Committee on Infrastructure, Environment and Spatial Planning (CIESP)

Committee on Justice (CJ)

Committee on Labour, Family, Social Policy and Disability (CLFSPD)

Committee on the Economy (CE)

Committee on the Interior, Public Administration and Local Self-Government (CIPALSG)

Joint Committee (JC)

Standing Commissions

Commission for Petitions, Human Rights and Equal Opportunities (CPHREO)

Commission for Public Office and Elections (CPOE)

Commission for Relations with Slovenes in Neighbouring and Other Countries (CRSNOC)

Commission for the National Communities (CNC)

Commission for the Rules of Procedure (CRP)

Constitutional Commission (ConstC)

Supervisory commissions

Commission for Public Finance Control (CPFC)

Commission for the Supervision of Intelligence and Security Services (CSISS)

Other bodies

Council of the Speaker (Council)

See also 

 List of Sessions of the 8th National Assembly of the Republic of Slovenia
Members of the 8th National Assembly of the Republic of Slovenia
Members of the working bodies of the 8th National Assembly of the Republic of Slovenia

References 

Slovenian politicians
National Assembly (Slovenia)
8th National Assembly (Slovenia)